Astarta Holding is a Ukrainian agricultural and industrial holding company. The company has been listed on Warsaw Stock Exchange since 2006. Its main producing assets are located in Poltava, Vinnytsia and Khmelnytskyi oblasts.

Astarta together with Borsch Ventures founded the IT company Agro Core, which specializes in the development and implementation of high-performance technological solutions in agriculture.

Timeline

 Agro-industrial holding Astarta-Kyiv was established in 1993.
 In 1996 — 1998, it began investing in agriculture. The assets of the first agricultural company Pustoviytove in the Poltava region were acquired in 1997.
 In 1999, a controlling stake in the first sugar plant Yareskivsky was acquired.
 In 2003, the сompany acquired the Zhdanivsky and Kobelyatsky sugar plants.
 In 2004 — 2005, the сompany acquired the Veselopodilsky and Globynsky sugar plants.
 In August 2006, Astarta's shares are listed on the Warsaw Stock Exchange.
 In 2007, the Group actively expanded operations by acquiring new agricultural companies and increasing the area of leased agricultural land.
 In May 2008, the сompany starts cooperation with the European Bank for Reconstruction and Development, by means of which energy efficiency program is being funded.
 In 2008, Astarta, was one of the first agricultural companies to sign an agreement with the Multilateral Carbon Credit Fund established by EBRD and European Investment Bank, with the aim to implement carbon credits under the Kyoto Protocol, which covers the reduction of carbon emissions from factories in the period from 2008 to 2012.
 In 2008, the сompany adopted the decision directed on geographical diversification. The Group has expanded its operations to Khmeltnitski region and acquired the Narkevychi sugar plant as well as agricultural enterprises in order to provide the sugar plant with own sugar beet.
 In 2009, the company came along the large-scale reconstruction process with the aim to combine agricultural assets and sugar plants within the same industrial association. As a result, the Company managed to optimize production, reduce administrative costs and improve asset management.
 In February 2011, the сompany acquired the Novoivankivskyi sugar plant in Kharkiv region. 
 In July 2011, European Bank for Reconstruction and Development (EBRD) approved a senior secured long-term loan of up to $80m for Astarta Holding. The proceeds will be used to consolidate the EBRD's existing loans to the company and provide additional long-term financing for further development of Astarta's agricultural and sugar infrastructure, as well as the expansion of the land bank and construction of a dairy farm. 
 In 2012, Astarta initiated construction of soybean processing plant and biogas complex.
In 2013, was purchased Novorozhitsky Sugar Plant (Poltava region).
In 2014, the soybean processing plant began work.
In 2016, the holding supported the opening of the Poltava branch of the Ukrainian Leadership Academy. This branch of the academy became the first regional branch of the academy after Kyiv.
Since the beginning of the Russian invasion of Ukraine 2022, the company has been accepting evacuated residents from the East, North and South of Ukraine, settling them in hostels and refugee centers and provided almost 38 million hryvnias of aid to the military and provided about a thousand tons of food products to the population free of charge. Astarta Holding deliver humanitarian aid from the UN World Food Program to the territory of Ukraine.

References

Agriculture companies of Ukraine
Ukrainian brands
Companies based in Kyiv